Glenhafod Park Stadium is a football stadium situated in a small valley just outside the village of Goytre, which is a district of Port Talbot, Wales, UK.

It is the home ground of Goytre United F.C.

The name Glenhafod is taken from the local disused coal mines in the surrounding hillside and shares the valley with the Goytre United F.C. social club and a horseback riding school.

In 1990 there was a 350-seater grandstand built, with floodlights being installed in 2000. The stadium holds 4,000 people and sits in-between the stadium's car park and the river Ffrwdwyllt.

Football venues in Wales
Sport in Port Talbot
Buildings and structures in Port Talbot
Stadiums in Wales
Tourist attractions in Neath Port Talbot